Birchall Lewis "Bert" Pearson (April 3, 1914 – September 13, 1960) was a Canadian athlete who competed in the 1932 Summer Olympics. He was born in Hamilton, Ontario.

In 1932 he was a member of the Canadian relay team which finished fourth in the 4×100 metre event. In the 100 metre competition as well as in the 200 metre contest he was eliminated in the semi-finals. At the 1934 Empire Games he won the silver medal with the Canadian team in the 4×110 yards relay event. In the 220 yards competition he was eliminated in the semi-finals and in the 100 yards contest he was eliminated in the heats.

References

External links
 Profile at trackfield.brinkster.net
 Birchall Pearson's profile at Sports Reference.com

1914 births
1960 deaths
Athletes from Hamilton, Ontario
Canadian male sprinters
Olympic track and field athletes of Canada
Athletes (track and field) at the 1932 Summer Olympics
Athletes (track and field) at the 1934 British Empire Games
Commonwealth Games silver medallists for Canada
Commonwealth Games medallists in athletics
Medallists at the 1934 British Empire Games